Vladimir Poletaev (Russian: Полетаев, Владимир Владимирович; born 27 June 1972) is a Russian politician serving as a senator from the Altai Krai since 30 September 2014.

Vladimir Poletaev is under personal sanctions introduced by the European Union, the United Kingdom, the USA, Canada, Switzerland, Australia, Ukraine, New Zealand, for ratifying the decisions of the "Treaty of Friendship, Cooperation and Mutual Assistance between the Russian Federation and the Donetsk People's Republic and between the Russian Federation and the Luhansk People's Republic" and providing political and economic support for Russia's annexation of Ukrainian territories.

Career 

Vladimir Poletaev was born on 23 May 1975 in Gorno-Altaysk, Altai Krai. In 1997, he graduated from the Altai State University. In 2002, he received a doctoral degree from the Russian Academy of National Economy and Public Administration under the President of the Russian Federation. From 1997 to 1998, he worked as the Leading Inspector of the Customs Investigations Department, Chief Inspector of the Legal Department of the Gorno-Altai Customs. After that, he served as the deputy chairman and Head of the Department for Insolvency (Bankruptcy) of Enterprises of the State Committee of the Republic of Altai for State Property Management. In 2003, he was appointed Deputy Minister, Head of the Insolvency (Bankruptcy) Department of the Ministry of Property Relations of the Altai Republic. Afterwards, he served as the head of the territorial body of the Federal Financial Recovery Service of Russia in the Altai Republic. From 2004 to 2006, he was the Minister of Property Relations. He left the position to become the Minister of Economic Development and Investments of the Republic of Altai. From 2010 to 2014, Poletaev served as the Deputy Head of the Department of the Federal Tax Service (FTS) of Russia for the Altai Krai. On 30 September 2014, he was appointed the senator from the Altai Krai.

References

Living people
1975 births
United Russia politicians
21st-century Russian politicians
Members of the Federation Council of Russia (after 2000)